Hope St. is the debut studio album by Glasgow based alternative rock band Kassidy. It was released on 21 March 2011. It shares several tracks with the band's series of Rubbergum EPs released the previous year.

Track listing

Bonus tracks

External links
 Official website
 Kassidy on Myspace
 Kassidy on Facebook

References

2011 debut albums
Kassidy albums
Mercury Records albums
Albums produced by Jim Abbiss